Proud Chinembriri (1958 – 15 February 1994), known professionally as Proud Kilimanjaro, was a Zimbabwean heavyweight boxer, who was the Zimbabwean heavyweight champion between 1982 and his retirement in 1990, and African Boxing Union champion between 1982 and 1987, and again between 1988 and 1990.

Career
Before taking up boxing, Chinembriri played football professionally as a goalkeeper in Zimbabwe for four years.

An imposing figure at 6 feet and 6 inches tall, and nicknamed the "man mountain", Kilimanjaro made his professional boxing debut in October 1981 with a fourth-round stoppage of Black Tiger, after being taken on by trainer and manager Dave Wellings. He had had no amateur fights as prospective opponents refused to fight him. In April 1982, in only his fifth fight he won the Zimbabwe heavyweight title with a knockout of Walter Ringo Starr, taking only 15 seconds. In September 1982 he stopped Adama Mensah in the sixth round in front of a crowd of 15,000 at the Rufaro Stadium, Harare to take the African Boxing Union heavyweight title. The win gave 'Kili' a top 10 WBC world ranking.

He remained undefeated during the first 4 years of his career, defending his ABU title against Joe Kalala, Ngozika Ekwelum, Kid Power, and Captain Cleopas Marvel, and made a successful defence of his Zimbabwean title against Jukebox Timebomb.

In November 1985 he faced Hughroy Currie in Cardiff in a Commonwealth title eliminator; The fight went the distance, with referee Harry Gibbs awarding the fight to Currie by a single point. Kilimanjaro did, however, get his shot at the title in March 1987 when he faced Horace Notice in Dudley, the champion stopping him in the eighth round.

He made a further successful defence of his African title against Mary Konate, before losing it to Michael Simuwelu in August 1987, regaining it a year later with an eleventh-round knockout of Simuwelu after taking on trainer Gabriel Moyo. He also made a further defence of his national title in December 1988, stopping Black Tiger in six rounds. He had two further fights, forcing Bombaphani Bonyongo Destroyer to retire with a cut in four rounds in July 1989, and a knockout of Sam Sithole in February 1990. He had been due to face Lennox Lewis in a televised Commonwealth title eliminator in London in February 1990 but was prevented from competing after refusing to divulge the results of an HIV test to the British Boxing Board of Control. He was subsequently barred from boxing by the Zimbabwe authorities and stripped of his national title.

He retired with a record of 32 wins and 6 defeats.

After suffering from AIDS-related illnesses including tuberculosis, he died on 15 February 1994, aged 36. He was buried in his home village, Buhera.

References

1958 births
1994 deaths
Zimbabwean male boxers
Heavyweight boxers
African Boxing Union champions
AIDS-related deaths in Zimbabwe
People from Manicaland Province